Luis Aurelio Pereira Lewis (born 27 March 1996) is a Panamanian professional footballer who plays for Universitario.

Club career
Pereira joined Toronto FC II on loan from Panamanian side C.D. Árabe Unido in April 2017, having trained with the Canadian side in February of the same year. He made his debut in a 0–0 draw with the Richmond Kickers.

Career statistics

Club

Notes

International

References

External links
 

1996 births
Living people
Association football midfielders
C.D. Árabe Unido players
Liga Panameña de Fútbol players
Expatriate soccer players in Canada
Panama international footballers
Panamanian expatriate footballers
Panamanian expatriate sportspeople in Canada
Panamanian footballers
Toronto FC II players
USL Championship players
2015 CONCACAF U-20 Championship players
Panama under-20 international footballers